Tezpur Law College is a private law school situated at Dhanua Nagar Road, Mahabhairab, Tezpur in the Indian state of Assam. It offers undergraduate LL.B 3 years law courses, 5 Year Integrated B.A. LL.B. and 2 years LL.M. courses affiliated to Gauhati University. This college was established in 1972 and the course conducted by it is recognised by Bar Council of India, New Delhi.

Tezpur Law College offers a three-year LLB program, which is a full-time course, and a two-year LLM program.

References

Law schools in Assam
Educational institutions established in 1972
1972 establishments in Assam
Colleges affiliated to Gauhati University
Education in Tezpur